Homeland Movement is the debut studio album by Australian rock band Yothu Yindi that was released in April 1989 on the Mushroom Records label. The album peaked at number 59 on the ARIA Chart in 1992.

Background and release
Following a tour of Australia and North America in late 1988, supporting Midnight Oil, the band signed with Mushroom Records and spent a day in Sydney recording a demo tape. Mushroom Records released the demo as the band's debut album.

One side of the album comprised punchy politicised rock songs, such as "Mainstream", whilst the other side concentrated on traditionally based songs like "Djapana (Sunset Dreaming)", written by former teacher Mandawuy Yunupingu.

Track listing
 "Mainstream" (Yunupingu)
 "Yolngu Woman" (Yunupingu)
 "Homeland Movement" (Yunupingu)
 "Yolngu Boy" (Yunupingu)
 "Djäpana" (Yunupingu)
 "Gamadala" (Traditional song, arranged by Witiyana Marika, Milkayngu Mununggurr, Yunupingu)
 "Garrtjambal" (Traditional song, arranged by Marika, Mununggurr, Yunupingu)
 "Mambulmambul" (Traditional song, arranged by Marika, Mununggurr, Yunupingu)
 "Gudurrku" (Traditional song, arranged by Marika, Mununggurr, Yunupingu)
 "Barrwula" (Traditional song, arranged by Marika, Mununggurr, Yunupingu)
 "Gunmarra" (Traditional song, arranged by Marika, Mununggurr, Yunupingu)
 "Luku-Wangawuy Manikay" (1788) (Djenarra Galarrwuy)

Personnel
 Mandawuy Yunupingu – vocals, guitar, clapsticks
 Witiyana Marika – vocals, clapsticks
 Milkayngu Mununggurr – didgeridoo
 Cal Williams – guitar
 Stuart Kellaway – bass guitar
 Andrew Belletty – drums
 Bart Willoughby – drums

Charts

Release history

References

1989 debut albums
Mushroom Records albums
Yothu Yindi albums